Roberto Carlos Salvarezza (born 30 January 1952) is an Argentine biochemist, researcher and politician. He was Argentina's Minister of Science, Technology and Innovation from 2019 to 2021, in the cabinet of President Alberto Fernández.

Salvarezza was president of the National Scientific and Technical Research Council (CONICET) from 2012 to 2015, and then served as a member of the Argentine Chamber of Deputies from 2015 to 2019 representing Buenos Aires Province, sitting in the Front for Victory bloc.

Early life and education
Roberto Carlos Salvarezza was born on 30 January 1952 in Lanús Oeste, in the southern side of the Greater Buenos Aires conurbation in Buenos Aires Province. He attended high school at the prestigious Colegio Nacional de Buenos Aires, and later finished his biochemistry licenciatura at the University of Buenos Aires (UBA) in 1977. In 1981 he finished his PhD in the same university; his dissertation was titled "The microbiological corrosion of aluminium and alloys in water-combustion systems".

Academic work
In the late 1980s he specialized his work on new scanning electron microscope technologies at the Autonomous University of Madrid; from then on his specialty was nanotechnology.

In 1992 he founded the Nanoscopy Laboratory of the Theoretical and Applied Physicochemical Research (INIFTA) at the National University of La Plata. He worked as director of said laboratory and also of the INIFTA. Throughout his career, Salvarezza has authored over 300 publications.

In April 2012 he was designated president of the National Scientific and Technical Research Council by then-Minister of Science Lino Barañao. Salvarezza resigned from the post in 2015 upon the ascension of Mauricio Macri to the presidency of Argentina, citing Macri's intended scientific policy as his main reason.

In July 2016, Salvarezza was elected representative of the Exact and Natural Sciences area in the CONICET directory, but his designation was not approved by the government in an unprecedented move. This caused controversy among the scientific community, wherein it was decried as "political discrimination". Salvarezza received the backing of the Directive Council of the UBA Faculty of Exact and Natural Sciences, the World Federation of Scientific Workers and the CyTa group.

Political career
In June 2017 Salvarezza was selected to go second in the Citizen's Unity Chamber of Deputies candidates party list in Buenos Aires Province in the 2017 legislative election, following Fernanda Vallejos. The list received 37% of the votes, second to the Cambiemos list, but it secured enough votes for Salvarezza to be elected for the 2017–2021 term.

In December 2019, Salvarezza was appointed Minister of Science, Technology and Innovation by newly elected president Alberto Fernández, succeeding Barañao. The Ministry had been downgraded to a secretariat during the presidency of Mauricio Macri, but it was restored to its ministerial status with Salvarezza's appointment. He was replaced with Daniel Filmus on 20 September 2021 as part of a cabinet reshuffle, following the government's poor showings in the 2021 legislative primary elections.

References

External links

 
 Official website of the Ministry of Science, Technology and Innovation 

1952 births
Living people
Argentine biochemists
People from Lanús
Government ministers of Argentina
University of Buenos Aires alumni
Academic staff of the National University of La Plata
21st-century Argentine politicians
Members of the Argentine Chamber of Deputies elected in Buenos Aires Province